Victoria Larraz Muñoz de Arce (born 26 August 1962 in Madrid, Spain), known professionally as Vicky Larraz is a Spanish singer and television presenter.

Albums and Singles

With Olé Olé 
 1983 - Olé Olé
 1984 - Voy a mil
 2013 - Por Ser Tú" (Single)
 2016 - Duetos-"Sin Control" (Album)
 2017 - En Control" (Album)
 2017 - Dejame Sola, Supernatural" (Singles)
 2017 - Victimas del Desamor" (Single)
 2017 - Bravo Samurai" (Single)

With OLE'STAR 
Vicky Larraz was founding member of OLE'STAR.
 2018 - Hoy Quiero Confesar (Single)
 2018 - Regala (Single)
 2019 - Bravo Samurai (Single)
 2019 - No Controles (Single)
 2019 - Dress You Up (Single)
 2019 - Imaginando (Single)
 2019 - Lili Bailando Sola (Single)
 2019 - Imaginando Mil Controles (Single)
 2019 - Solo Promesas (Single)
 2019 - Soldados del Amor- feat Layonel (Single)
 2019 - Seré Luz (Single)
 2020 - A Fuego Lento (Single)
 2020 - Tal Vez Será - Feat Mago de Oz (Single)
 2020 - Gracias por pensar en mí -Feat Antonio Pavón (Single)
 2021 - Me Lo He Quedao (Single)
 2022 - Que ha pasado entre tú y yo (Single)

Solo albums 
 1986 - Vicky Larraz
 1987 - Siete noches sin ti
 1989 - Huracán
 2001 - Todas sus grabaciones en CBS
 2010 - Contigo otra vez
 2012 - Earthquake (Single)
 2015 - Llevatelo Todo 7-CD Box Set

References

External links 
 

Spanish women singers
Spanish television personalities
Living people
Singers from Madrid
1962 births